According to the New Testament, Lois was the grandmother of Timothy. According to extrabiblical tradition, she was born into the Jewish faith, and later accepted Christianity along with her daughter Eunice.

Her only biblical mention is in 2 Timothy 1:5, where the author tells TimothyIt has been suggested that Lois, Eunice, and Timothy may have been kinsfolk of Paul, hence his apparent intimacy with the family and his knowledge of their faith.

Lois has often been used as an example for Christian grandmothers and creating a heritage of faith. Dale Evans Rogers suggests that "her example, her teachings, and her faith" were strong influences in Timothy's life.

References

People in the Pauline epistles
Women in the New Testament
Early Jewish Christians
1st-century Jews